Arulmigu Mariamman Temple, Samayapuram is an ancient Hindu temple in Tiruchirappalli in Tamil Nadu, India. The main deity, Samayapurathal or Mariamman, a form of supreme mother goddess Durga or Maha Kali or Aadi Shakthi, is made of sand, clay with extractions of herbs unlike many of the traditional Mariamman deities is considered as most powerful Goddess, and hence unlike many other Hindu deities there are no abhishekams (sacred bathing) conducted to the main deity, but instead the "abishekam" is done to the small stone statue in front of it.

It is believed by the devotees that the Goddess has enormous powers over curing illnesses
and hence, it is a ritual to buy small metallic replicas, made with silver or steel, of various body parts that need to be cured, and these are deposited in the donation box.

Devotees also offer mavilakku (Tamil - மாவிளக்கு), a sweet dish made of jaggery, rice flour and ghee.
 Offerings of raw salt is also made to the Goddess by the rural devotees.

The temple attracts thousands of devotees on Sundays, Tuesdays and Fridays, the holy days for Mariamman.  Samayapuram is the second most wealthy (in terms of cash flows) temple in Tamil Nadu after Palani.

History

History of the temple is unclear. In the early 18th century, King Vijayaraya Chakkaravarthi built the present day form of the temple. There is scant history of the period before that though it is believed that the locals worship the Goddess for many centuries before building the current temple. One legend says that the present deity was at the Ranganathaswamy temple at Srirangam, and one of chief priests of the temple believed that the idol caused him illness and hence asked it to be removed from the temple. It is a common belief in that part of the region that such local Gods have immense powers and they must always be satisfied by proper offerings and sacrifices. The idol was moved outside Srirangam, and later found by some of the passerby who built a temple named, the Kannanur Mariamman temple.

During that period (around the 17th century CE), Trichi was ruled by the Vijayanagar kings and the area was used as an army base. It is believed that they made a commitment to build the temple if they win the war and after attaining success they built a shrine for the Goddess. Originally it was under the management of the Thiruvanaikaval temple, a popular one in the region. Later, the control was split and currently Samayapuram is under an independent trust monitored by the Government of Tamil Nadu, which also monitors the annadanam distribution (an act of offering food to the devotees).

The new urchavar panchaloga idol was donated to the temple in the year 1991.

The temple is maintained and administered by the Hindu Religious and Charitable Endowments Department of the Government of Tamil Nadu.

Festivals

Thai Poosam, usually occurring in the Tamil month of Thai.
Like most Tamil temples the main festival is during the start of the summer, generally in April. During this time, the temple chariot processions and teppams (lake processions) happen.
All the Fridays in the Tamil months of Aadi (15 July - 17 August) and Thai (15 January – 15 February) are celebrated in a grand manner.

Significance of the temple
Samayapuram is a significant symbol of the native culture in rural Tamil Nadu and there a number of unique practices concerning the Mariamman temples. Samayapuram has been used a model to describe rural folklore in a number of research works on sociology and religion.

During festivals, it is not unusual to find people doing extreme things to make their bodies suffer as an act of sacrifice including, walking over a red-hot bed of charcoal and holding hot mud-vessel in bare hands. Mariamman temples also typically involve Samiyattam wherein through a devotee (usually a female) Goddess Mariamman chooses to talk to help and bless the gathered devotees. The personality of the Goddess as well as the tremendous strain put on the body by the channelling (both physically and emotionally), maybe interpreted by non-believers as hysteria or hyper-excitement.

Heritage of Samayapuram outside India
The legacy of Samayapuram is well spread beyond Tamil Nadu and even after centuries of emigrating from India, many people in Sri Lanka, Singapore, South Africa and Fiji still maintain their loyalties to the temple and try to create similar temples and environment in their new country, raising both a cause of concern and an appreciation of diversity.There is also a Samayapuram Mariamman Temple in Tanjong Rambutan at Malaysia.There is also a shrine for Goddess Sri Samayapuram Mariamman at the Sri Veeramuthu Muneeswarar Temple which is located at Yishun Industrial Park and Veeramakaliamman Temple, Serangoon Road, Singapore. During the month of Aadi,the annual Kozh Valarpu festival is conducted with much grandeur by the Sri Samayapuram Mariamman Pillaigal at Jurong West,Singapore. An annual Samayapuram Sri Mariamman puja takes place at Jurong West Street 71, prior to the annual fire walking festival by Anbalahan and Family

Chithirai Ther Thiruvila (Chariot Festival in the month of Chithirai)
Samayapuram is located 15 km from Tiruchirappalli on the National Highway (NH-45) which is now a 4-lane road from Chennai to Tiruchirappalli.

At Samayapuram, the Chithirai Chariot Festival is celebrated for a period of 13 days. The Festival Starts on the 1st Tuesday of the month "Chithirai" (April). The 'Ther' (Ther = chariot) procession during the Chariot Festival is on the 10th day of the Festival. The 'ther' with Goddess Samayapuram Mariamman will be pulled around the Temple by devotees.  It is a Maha Festival --- Grand Festival, which attracts Lakhs of Devotees.

Arrangement during the Chariot Festival
During the Chariot Festival, no vehicle is allowed to go inside SamayaPuram Town and all the vehicles  are stopped one Kilometer away from the Town and everybody have to go to the temple by walk.

The Crowd is so much, though the Government made so many arrangements, still it is un-manageable. Luckily for Devotees, nowadays, they are following the traffic rule of left side walking in the road. This helps a lot for the smooth movement, which avoids any complications associated with big crowds. Still you will find that so many children missing, which is being announced during the festival time in the loud speakers.

During the Chariot Festival time, the Local Government arranges a ‘’’Special Bus Stand’’’, which is one Kilometer away from the SamayaPuram Town.  All the Buses and any other 2 / 3 / 4 wheelers are stopped there only. The vehicles which are going beyond Samayapuram in NH-45 will only be allowed with a little bit delay.

The 4 laning of the National Highway 45 has helped to ease traffic congestion to a considerable extent. Onward traffic can take the flyover, while those going to Samayapuram for Darshan can take the Service Lane which leads to the Temple.

For festival days, during the Chithirai Chariot Festivals, there are 24 hours bus services to nearby places like, Salem, Namakkal, Karur, Thuraiyur, Thanjavur and other nearby Small Towns. Further, there are continuous Town Bus Services provided which mainly connect to Tollgate (Salem-Trichy main road junction), Chatram Bus Stand and Central Bus Stand.

During the Festival days we can see that, the Tamil Nadu Police, NCC, Scout (School and College Students) Controlling the Crowd  every where including the Temple premises.

Mother of all Mothers, Samayapurathal
is a very powerful goddess Who fulfils the heartfelt prayers of her devotees. Only in a very few temples, you are able to see the presiding deity from the entrance of the temple itself. Samayapurathu Mariyamman can be seen even from the main entrance of the Temple and it will look like that the Mother has been waiting for your arrival all along.

References

External links
Templenet article
Samayapuram history
Tamil Nadu government's tourism page
Samayapuram
srirangam temple,Related place
temple

Hindu temples in Tiruchirappalli
Mariamman temples